My Brother's Name Is Robert and He Is an Idiot is a 2018 German drama film directed by Philip Gröning. It was selected to compete for the Golden Bear in the main competition section at the 68th Berlin International Film Festival.

Cast
  as Robert
  as Elena
  as Erich
 Stefan Konarske as Adolf
 Zita Aretz as Cecilia
 Karolina Porcari as teacher

References

External links
 

2018 films
2018 drama films
German drama films
2010s German-language films
2010s German films